Amman United Rugby Football Club is a Welsh rugby union team from the Amman valley north of Swansea. The club plays at Cwmamman Recreation Ground between Garnant and Glanamman; before the coal-mining boom the two towns were a single village called Cwmamman.

The club is a member of the Welsh Rugby Union and is a feeder club for the Scarlets regional team. Amman United has supplied several players to the Wales rugby union team including Claude Davey and Tom Day and in Trevor Evans, one member of the British and Irish Lions.

Amman United came second in the WRU Division Four West and were promoted in 2012; by the end of the year they were leading WRU Division Three West. In 2017 Amman UTD won the national bowl in Principality Stadium and also were crowned champions of WRU Division 3B West undefeated.  Shane Williams, the record try scorer for Wales, still lives in the area, he now plays for Amman UTD and continues his involvement in the club.

The club has a history of unearthing naturally gifted wingers, Geraint Bapo (Beebap) and Owen Spud Madge to name but a few.  It is an internationally acknowledged travesty that its most prodigious son was never bestowed with a Lions cap (let alone a Welsh one).  Only Warren Gatland, and Gareth Jenkins and Mike Ruddock before him know the answer to the best kept secret in Welsh rugby. Why has Christopher Preston not represented his country? An eternal hero in the red of Amman regardless.

Notable former players
  Tom Day
  Carwyn James
  Trevor Evans
  Joe Rees
  William "Billo" Rees
  Shane Williams
Dai Davies
Ted Ward
Geraint’bapo’

References

External links
The Centenary History of Amman United Rugby Football Club, 1903-2003
History of Cwmamman Recreational Ground
Rick O'Shea visits Shane Williams's home club - TV segment

Rugby clubs established in 1903
Welsh rugby union teams